Pier Larrauri (born 26 March 1994 in Peru) is a Peruvian footballer.

References

Peruvian footballers
Living people
Association football midfielders
1994 births
Sporting Cristal footballers
Deportivo Municipal footballers
Cienciano footballers
Club Alianza Lima footballers